Battle of Messines may refer to:
Battle of Messines (1914)
Battle of Messines (1917) 
Battle of Messines (1918)